College rugby is played by men and women throughout colleges and universities in the United States of America. Seven-a-side and fifteen-a-side variants of rugby union are most commonly played. Most collegiate rugby programs do not fall under the auspices of the NCAA and are instead governed by National Collegiate Rugby and USA Rugby, two nationwide governing bodies. 27 women's programs participate in the NCAA.

College rugby is the fastest growing college sport in the US and one of the fastest growing sports in the nation. Women's rugby has been classified as an NCAA Emerging Sport since 2002. Between 2004 and 2010, rugby was the fastest growing sport in the United States when its popularity increased by roughly 350% (when the estimated active participants increased from 18,500 in 2006 to 65,000 in 2010). There are over 900 college teams—male and female—registered with USA Rugby and hundreds more with National Collegiate Rugby.
There are over 32,000 college players registered with USA Rugby, making college rugby the largest section of USA Rugby's membership. In 2011 USA Rugby created a new Division 1-A with approximately 30 schools forming a new premier division.

There has been increased interest in college rugby (particularly in rugby sevens) from TV since the International Olympic Committee's announcement in 2009 that rugby would return to the Summer Olympics in 2016. 
The highest profile college rugby sevens competition is the Collegiate Rugby Championship (CRC), which began in 2010. College club rugby has included several championship competitions since 1980.

Rugby has been played in universities since as early as the 1800s, but it was the 1960s when rugby really found a foothold in colleges, led by the Catholic colleges such as Notre Dame and particularly the Jesuit universities such as Boston College and St. Joseph's in Philadelphia. Several schools have increased their investments in men's and women's rugby programs, by creating rugby programs with varsity or quasi-varsity status and funding for scholarships.

Alumni from collegiate programs make up much of the United States men's and women's national teams. Major League Rugby implemented its first collegiate MLR Draft in 2020. Players are eligible for the draft after 3 years in college at 21 years old. Free agents can try to join teams at 18 years old.

Governance

In the United States, college rugby was traditionally governed by (in descending order of authority): USA Rugby, geographical unions (GUs) and local area unions (LAUs) (e.g., NERFU) and administered by a College Management Committee. By 2011 USA Rugby was urging college rugby programs to adopt new conference structures like the conferences used by their other athletic programs. The highest profile example was the formation of the Ivy Rugby Conference in 2009. This move signaled a shift away from the LAUs and GUs as the governing bodies for regional college rugby.

College rugby is often called a club sport because teams are usually administered by a student club sports department rather than the intercollegiate athletics department. Some schools have promoted rugby to varsity status, committing resources for scholarships and paid coaches, or given rugby an elevated status short of full varsity status. The NCAA has no authority over men's college rugby, but 27 schools have opted to govern their women's teams under all applicable NCAA bylaws for recruiting and eligibility, under the NCAA's Emerging Sports for Women program.

In 2019, in the wake of USA Rugby's bankruptcy declaration, the College Rugby Association of America (CRAA) formed to oversee the top-level men's and women's divisions.

Play and participation

Winter and spring are the primary seasons for conferences in the Pacific, Northwest, and South regions (e.g., PAC, Southeastern); the fall is the primary season for conferences in the Northeast, Mid-Atlantic and Upper Midwest (e.g., Big Ten, Atlantic Coast). Conferences establish playing schedules in the primary season, while in the secondary season the teams often set up friendly matches or focus on playing rugby sevens.

USA Rugby maintains player eligibility guidelines, administered by the local area unions. College players generally have five years of rugby eligibility from the time they graduate high school. On-field disciplinary issues are generally handled by the local area unions, while off-field disciplinary issues are governed by the academic institution and the local area union. USA Rugby's CIPP insurance program provides liability insurance to players, teams, administrators, and pitch hosts in exchange for an annual dues payment. Roughly one quarter of college rugby programs offer financial aid to their players.

Outstanding college rugby players are recognized as All-Americans. Qualified All-Americans can represent the United States in international tournaments by playing on the United States national under-20 rugby union team or the All Americans rugby union team.

Divisions
College rugby competition in the USA is divided into several tiers:
The highest is Division I-A for men and Division I Elite for women
Division I-AA for men and Division I for women
Division II
Small College
The separate National Intercollegiate Rugby Association (NIRA) consists of women's NCAA DI, II and III rugby programs that adhere to NCAA organizational rules under a sanctioning agreement with USA Rugby.

USA Rugby generally allows colleges to select the division in which the college thinks it would fit best. Most schools remain in the same division from year-to-year, but there are exceptions. Schools that have been successful in a particular division may move up but are not required to do so; likewise, poorly performing schools may move down a division, but are not required to. Successful schools may have varied reasons for declining promotion. For example, a school may prefer to remain in its current conference against traditional rivals, or a school with a small budget might resist the additional travel expense that might come from switching divisions and conferences.

Significant movement across men's divisions occurred in 2011 when USA Rugby separated Division I into Division I-A and I-AA. This new arrangement caused Division I schools to choose one or the other, with 31 schools joining Division I-A and the majority of Division I schools joining Division I-AA. Additionally, the creation of Division I-AA caused several successful Division II schools to move up to Division I-A. The evolving division structures caused significant shifts in schools between Divisions I-A and I-AA in the following years, with half of the original 31 D I-A members leaving by the end of 2013, and new schools from lower divisions taking their place.

The governance of collegiate rugby was split and diverged in 2021. The umbrella of the USA Rugby Collegiate Council includes College Rugby Association of America (CRAA), American Collegiate Rugby Association (ACRA), American College Rugby (ACR), and independent conferences. National Collegiate Rugby (NCR), formerly NSCRO, challenged the existing structure and expanded beyond small colleges to include the higher divisions. Men's and women's conferences each chose as individual conferences (in some cases, schools within conferences also chose) to align with USA Rugby or NCR.

Women
Twelve women's conferences that played historically in DII left the oversight of USA Rugby to join NCR.  Beginning in 2021, women's college rugby within NCR is split between Small College and an Open Division. The Open Division, which NCR now refers to as its DI, is made up of teams from these 12 conferences.

According to Goff Rugby Report, the DI Elite women's teams are part of College Rugby Association of America, and so are most women's DI conferences (eight conferences) and the independents. There are also a couple of DII or hybrid conferences within CRAA.

The American Collegiate Rugby Association is a group of four DII-level women's conferences remaining under the aegis of USA Rugby, which included 62 teams as of June 2020.

The collegiate women's programs in the NIRA operate their own regular season competition and championship.

Men
In 2021, most DII men's rugby conferences aligned with NCR.

Two men's conferences that played DIA in 2019 joined NCR in 2021, as have three DIAA conferences. Under NCR, they competed in fall 2021 as DI and DIAA, with separate postseasons.

Men's DIAA was dramatically split in 2021, with both NCR and CRAA-run postseasons in the fall. There was also a CRAA-run postseason in spring 2022. According to Goff Rugby Report, there was no way to have a sole men's DIAA national champion in 2021–2022.

In 2021, there are five men's DIA conferences plus independents under USA Rugby/CRAA.

Varsity programs

Men's varsity
Majority of colleges classify their rugby programs as club sports rather than varsity sports. A small but growing number of universities, however, have begun labeling rugby as a varsity sport, realizing that rugby can be profitable, as a successful rugby program can result in national championships and increased marketability.

Women's Rugby: An NCAA Emerging Sport
 
Since 2002, a growing number of schools have begun adding women's rugby as an NCAA sport. These women's rugby programs have received sanctioning by the National Collegiate Athletic Association. The NCAA has identified women's rugby as an NCAA Emerging Sports for Women. An "Emerging Sport" must gain championship status (minimum 40 varsity programs for team sports, except 28 for Division III) within 10 years, or show steady progress toward that goal to remain on the list. Until then, it is under the auspices of the NCAA and its respective institutions. Emerging Sport status allows for competition to include club teams to satisfy the minimum number of competitions bylaw established by the NCAA.

The NCAA identified women's rugby as an "Emerging Sport" in 2002 in light of the fact that nearly 350 collegiate women's rugby clubs were active. Growth was initially slow, with only 5 women's NCAA programs forming within the first few years. The push for NCAA rugby status received a boost in 2009 when the International Olympic Committee announced that rugby would return to the Summer Olympics in 2016. Although NCAA Division I schools dropped 72 women's varsity sports teams during 2008–2012 due to the economic recession, women's rugby programs grew in number during that time frame.

As of the fall of 2022, the NCAA has sanctioned rugby for 27 schools across 3 Divisions. Current NCAA women's rugby programs include the following: This league is known as the National Intercollegiate Rugby Association (NIRA)

For the 2022–23 season, Princeton University will join as an NCAA D1 team.

Division 1 National Championships (15s)

Men's National Championship

Sports Illustrated named Notre Dame national champion in 1966. In 1967, Sports Illustrated named California national champions after their 37–3 defeat of Notre Dame.

1980–2012
Except for interruption by the COVID-19 pandemic, USA Rugby has crowned an official national men's champion each year since 1980. After the 2010 season, USA Rugby split Division 1 into two, with the top flight called Division 1-A Rugby (formerly called the College Premier Division), and the second flight called Division 1-AA.

YEAR; CHAMPION; RUNNER-UP

1980 – California 15, Air Force 9
1981 – California 6, Harvard 3 (a.e.t.)
1982 – California 15, Life College 14
1983 – California 13, Air Force 3
1984 – Harvard 12, Colorado 4
1985 – California 31, Maryland 6
1986 – California 6, Dartmouth 4
1987 – San Diego State 10, Air Force 9
1988 – California 9, Dartmouth 3
1989 – Air Force 25, Penn State 7
1990 – Air Force 18, Army 12
1991 – California 20, Army 14
1992 – California 27, Army 17
1993 – California 36, Air Force 6
1994 – California 27, Navy 13
1995 – California 48, Air Force 16
1996 – California 47, Penn State 6
1997 – California 41, Penn State 15
1998 – California 34, Stanford 15
1999 – California 36, Penn State 5
2000 – California 62, Wyoming 16
2001 – California 86, Penn State 11
2002 – California 43, Utah 22
2003 – Air Force 45, Harvard 37
2004 – California 46, Cal Poly  24
2005 – California 44, Utah 7
2006 – California 29, BYU 26
2007 – California 37, BYU 7
2008 – California 59, BYU 7
2009 – BYU 25, California 22
2010 – California 19, BYU 7
2011 – California 21, BYU 14
2012 – BYU 49, Arkansas State 42

2013–2017

In 2013, eight of the top college rugby teams withdrew from the USA Rugby D1A competition and organized their own championship called the Varsity Cup. The media and other rugby commentators viewed the Varsity Cup as equivalent to the USA Rugby D1A championship, given the strength of the teams participating and the fact that the 2013 Varsity Cup finalists – BYU and Cal – finished the spring 2013 season as the consensus #1 and #2 ranked teams in all of college rugby. Four additional schools joined the Varsity Cup for 2014, bringing the number of teams in that tournament to twelve. The Varsity Cup was successful in gaining media exposure, with the 2014 Varsity Cup final televised live on NBCSN. USA Rugby responded to the successful promotion of its Varsity Cup rivals by signing a ten-year contract in October 2014 with IMG that would focus on the marketing and increase exposure of USA Rugby's Collegiate National Championship.  The Varsity Cup folded in November 2017 when the organizer, broadcast partner and a major sponsor, Penn Mutual, withdrew their support.

The lists below show the champions for the Division 1-A Rugby and the Varsity Cup championships for each year, along with the teams' final regular season rankings, as ranked by RugbyMag/RugbyToday.com.

USA Rugby championship:
2013: (#3) Life University 16 – 14 St. Mary's (CA) (#5)
2014: (#1) St. Mary's (CA) 21 – 6 Life University (#3)
2015: (#3) St. Mary's (CA) 30 – 24 Life University (#4)
2016: (#3) Life University 24 – 20 St. Mary's (CA) (#5)
2017: (#1) St. Mary's (CA) 30 – 24 Life University (#2)

Varsity Cup Championship:
2013: (#1) BYU 27 – 24 California (#2)
2014: (#2) BYU 43 – 33 California (#4)
2015: (#1) BYU 30 – 27 California (#2)
2016: (#1) Cal 40 – 29 BYU (#2)
2017: (#3) Cal 43 – 13 Arkansas St. (#5)

2018–present
 2018: Life University 60 – 5 California 
 2019: Life University 29 – 26 California
 2020: cancelled (pandemic)
 2021: cancelled (pandemic)
 2022: Army 20 – 8 St. Mary's (CA)

National Collegiate Rugby (Men)
Division I

2021 (fall) – St. Bonaventure 19 – 18 Penn State

Men's Division 1-AA
YEAR; CHAMPION; RUNNER-UP
2011: Davenport 38 – 19 UC Santa Barbara
2012: Davenport 39 – 0 San Diego State (Davenport promoted to D-1A for the following season)
2013: Central Florida 27 – 25 Lindenwood (Lindenwood promoted to D-1A for the following season)
2014: Central Florida 64 – 13 Arizona
2015: UC Davis 18 – 15 Central Florida
2016: UC Davis 17 – 13 Notre Dame College
2017: Notre Dame College 40 – 20 UC Davis
2018: Mary Washington 38 – 30 Dartmouth
2018 fall: Bowling Green 19 - 7 Saint Joseph's
2019 spring: Dartmouth 46 - 5 Chico State
2019 fall: Iowa Central Community College 36 - 21 Western Michigan
2020 spring: cancelled (pandemic)
2020 fall: cancelled (pandemic)
2021 spring: cancelled (pandemic)
2021 fall: Tennessee 36 - 31 Bowling Green (CRAA)
2022 spring: Fresno State 22 - 17 Kansas (ACR)

National Collegiate Rugby (Men)

2021 fall: Virginia Tech 34 – 22 West Chester

Women's College Club Division 1

The following are the results from the D1 women's club national championship, from 1991 to the present. USA Rugby established a new division called "Division I Elite" that began championship competition in 2016.

Division I Elite
2016 – Penn State 15, Brigham Young 5
2017 – Penn State 28, Lindenwood 25
2018 – Lindenwood 36, Life University 9
2019 – Lindenwood 36, Life University 19
2020 – cancelled (pandemic)
2021 – Lindenwood 54, Life University 12
2022 – Lindenwood 21, Life University 0
2022 (fall) – Lindenwood 17, Life University 15 (CRAA, moved from spring 2023 to fall 2022)

Division I

1991 – Air Force, runner-up Boston College
1992 – Boston College, runner-up Connecticut
1993 – Connecticut, runner-up Air Force
1994 – Air Force, runner-up Boston College
1995 – Princeton, runner-up Penn State
1996 – Princeton, runner-up Penn State
1997 – Penn State, runner-up Radcliffe
1998 – Radcliffe, runner-up Penn State
1999 – Stanford, runner-up Princeton
2000 – Penn State, runner-up Princeton
2001 – Chico State, runner-up Penn State
2002 – Air Force, runner-up Penn State
2003 – Air Force, runner-up Illinois
2004 – Penn State, runner-up Princeton
2005 – Stanford 53, Penn State 6
2006 – Stanford 15, Penn State 12
2007 – Penn State 22, Stanford 21
2008 – Stanford 15, Penn State 10
2009 – Penn State 46, Stanford 7
2010 – Penn State 24, Stanford 7
2011 – Army 33, Penn State 29
2012 – Penn State 32, Stanford 12
2013 – Penn State 65, Norwich 10
2014 – Penn State 38, Stanford 0
2015 – Penn State 61, Central Washington 7 
2015–16 (fall) Connecticut 19, Air Force 12
(spring) UC Davis 30, Virginia 25
2016–17 (fall) Air Force 19, Connecticut 8
(spring) UC Davis 27, Notre Dame College 19
2017–18 (fall) Davenport 89, Notre Dame College 24
(spring) Chico State 54, UCF 26
2018–19 (fall) Air Force 40, Davenport 27
(spring) BYU 48, Virginia Tech 0
2019–20 (fall) Air Force 26, Navy 10
(spring) cancelled (pandemic)
2020–21 (fall) cancelled (pandemic)
(spring) cancelled (pandemic)
2021–22 (fall) Navy 20, Davenport 12 (CRAA)
(spring) BYU 80, Virginia Tech 7 (CRAA)

National Collegiate Rugby (Women)
Division I

2021 (fall) – Life University 87, Northern Iowa 3 (For NCR in 2021, Life University fielded a largely freshman and sophomore team.)

College Rugby Sevens
Since the 2009 announcement that rugby sevens will be included in the 2016 Olympics, college rugby sevens has grown more popular.
The addition of Rugby 7s to the 2016 Summer Olympics has led to increasing interest from TV and other media coverage, and an increased emphasis in the collegiate ranks on the 7s game. For example, the University of Texas founded its competitive rugby sevens program in 2010. Cal rugby announced in December 2011 that beginning in 2013 it would use the fall term for sevens.

Collegiate Rugby Championship

The Collegiate Rugby Championship (CRC) is the highest profile college sevens rugby championship in the United States. The inaugural CRC, held in Columbus, Ohio in June 2010 was televised live by NBC and NBC Universal. The result was high ratings, with the CRC ratings beating the NCAA lacrosse championship.

The success of the inaugural 2010 tournament led to a second tournament in 2011 at PPL Park in Philadelphia, again televised live by NBC. NBC recognized that rugby is growing in popularity, participation, and interest.
In 2014, the Penn Mutual Life Insurance company become the title sponsor of the championship. The tournament grew each year and was signed to a multi-year deal with several large sponsors and Talen Energy Stadium (Formerly PPL Park) for the tournament to be held in Philadelphia for several more years. The success of the tournament in 2016 showed how popular this collegiate level event had become.  The National Collegiate Rugby Organization obtained the rights to the CRC in 2020 and since 2021 has staged its championship 7s matches at the tournament in New Orleans.

Men's
YEAR: CHAMPION; SCORE; RUNNER-UP
2010:  Utah 31 – 26 California 
 2011: Dartmouth 32 – 10 Army
 2012: Dartmouth 24 – 5 Arizona 
 2013: California 19 – 14 Life 
 2014: California 24 – 21 Kutztown
 2015: California 17 – 12 (a.e.t.) Kutztown
 2016: California 31 – 7 UCLA
 2017: California 19 – 0 Life
 2018: Lindenwood 24 – 7 UCLA
 2019: Lindenwood 21 – 12 Life
 2020: cancelled (pandemic)
 2021: Lindenwood 24 – 14 Life
 2022: Kutztown 17 – 12 Dartmouth (Premier)

Women's
2011 – Army 14, Penn State 5
 2012 – not held
2013 – Penn State 31, Ohio State 5
2014 – Penn State 29, James Madison 12
2015 – Penn State 24, Lindenwood 7
2016 – Life 19, Lindenwood 10
2017 – Life 17, Lindenwood 12
2018 – Lindenwood 21, Penn State 12
2019 – Lindenwood 34, Army 12
2020 – cancelled (pandemic)
2021 – Lindenwood 10, Life 7
2022 – Lindenwood 19, Life 7 (Premier)

USA Rugby National Championship

USA Rugby announced in September 2011 the creation of a new sevens tournament, the USA Rugby Sevens Collegiate National Championships. The tournament was held annually at the end of the fall season for its first three years and featured 24 teams. Qualification is based on performance at sevens tournaments during the fall, where tournament winners receive automatic bids, with the remaining places in the 24-team field filled by invitation. Some of the more high-profile qualifying tournaments include tournaments based on traditional conference rivalries, such as the Atlantic Coast 7s (composed mostly of ACC schools), the Southeastern 7s (composed mostly of SEC schools) and the Heart of America 7s (composed mostly of Big 12 schools).

The inaugural Championship tournament was held December 16–17, 2011 in College Station, Texas, and was contested by 24 teams that qualified based on performance in qualifying tournaments throughout the fall of 2011. The 2011 tournament was won by Life University, defeating Central Washington 22–17 in overtime. Tim Stanfill of Central Washington was the tournament MVP, Derek Patrick of Miami was the tournament's leading try scorer, and Colton Caraiga of Life University was the tournament's leading points scorer. In the first three years, strong teams that won bids have declined to participate.

Men's Division I
2011: Life University 22–17 Central Washington
2012: Arkansas State 21–7 Life University
2013: Arkansas State 32–12 Saint Mary's (CA)
2014: (moved from fall 2014 to spring 2015)
2015: Lindenwood 28–10 Davenport
2016: Saint Mary's 7–5 AIC
2017: Lindenwood 26–5 Saint Mary's
2018: Lindenwood 26–12 California
2019: Lindenwood 36–0 AIC
2020: cancelled (pandemic)
2021: cancelled (pandemic)
2022: Life University 24–19 (a.e.t.) Lindenwood

Men's Division IAA
2019: Lindenwood-Belleville 19–5 Western Michigan
2020: cancelled (pandemic)
2021: cancelled (pandemic)
2022: San Diego 28–14 Harvard

Women's

Division 1 Elite:
2018: Lindenwood 20–0 Penn State
2019: Lindenwood 24–7 Dartmouth
2020: cancelled (pandemic)
2021: cancelled (pandemic)
2022: Lindenwood 32–0 Dartmouth
Division 1
2011: Norwich University 34–5 Boston College
2012: Norwich University 17–5 Navy
2013: Norwich University 17–10 James Madison
2014: (moved from fall to spring)
2015: Penn State 47–26 Central Washington
2016: Life 10–0 Lindenwood
2017 (Open, all divisions): Lindenwood 31–12 Life
2018 (Open to DII): Air Force 20–17 Chico State
2019: Air Force 21–5 Virginia Tech
2020: cancelled (pandemic)
2021: cancelled (pandemic)
2022: Davenport 24–17 Navy

American Collegiate Rugby Championship Sevens
The American Collegiate Rugby Championship Sevens (ACRC7s) is an annual college sevens tournament played in between April and May. For some D1 teams, the ACRC7s is the first spring opportunity to play elite-caliber sevens rugby in the run-up to the Collegiate Rugby Championship. In its first three years, the tournament has taken place at the Virginia Beach Sportsplex in Virginia Beach, Virginia.

Men's Division 1 ACRC7s Champions
 2014: American International College 38–17 Kutztown University
 2015: Kutztown University 36–27 American International College
 2016: Naval Academy 17–14 Kutztown University

Conference membership
Team rankings are in parenthesis, based on Goff Rugby Report rankings, current as of January 2017.

Division I-A

 The conference champion is invited to the D1A playoffs along with several at large bids for independents or other highly ranked teams.

Division I-AA
Italics indicate second teams of clubs competing in D I-A. These teams are ineligible for Division I-AA playoffs.

Former Conferences:
 The Mid-Eastern conference disbanded in summer 2012, as most members went to the D1-A Big Ten Universities or to the D1-AA Mid-America conference.
 The Midwest conference disbanded in summer 2012, as most members went to the D1-A Big Ten Universities or to Division 2.

Organization and conferences
American college rugby is governed by USA Rugby. In the past, college rugby competitions have been governed by local unions.

The structure of the college game has evolved significantly in recent years. To increase the marketability of the game, many traditional rivals have been consolidated into conferences resembling major NCAA conferences such as the Pac-12 and Big Ten.

Conferences and conference tournaments
Beginning around 2010, college rugby programs began realigning into conference structures that mirror the traditional NCAA conferences used by the member schools' other athletic programs. The first high-profile example was the formation of the Ivy League Rugby Conference in 2010. Following the organization of the Ivy League schools, the members of the Atlantic Coast Conference and the Southeastern Conference followed suit in 2010.

Ivy Rugby Conference

The Ivy Rugby Conference was formed and had its first full season in 2009. The IRC was formed to foster better competition among rugby teams from the Ivy League schools and to raise the quality of play. The IRC has had consistent success in attracting commercial interests. The IRC formed committees to manage the league, independently of the LAUs and TUs. Prior to formation of the IRC, clubs from the eight Ivy League schools had competed in the Ivy Rugby Championship Tournament since 1969.

Southeastern Collegiate Rugby Conference

In December 2010, a core group of founding schools formed the Southeastern Collegiate Rugby Conference (SCRC). By April 2010, the SCRC had expanded to 11 schools, comprising the entire membership of the NCAA's Southeastern Conference (SEC) at that time except for Arkansas. Tennessee won the 2010 Southeastern Collegiate Rugby Sevens Championship beating LSU 19–17, and repeated in the 2011 SCRC Olympic Sevens Championship, beating Florida 26–14 in the final. Similar to other conferences, the SCRC has also enjoyed commercial success, announcing in fall 2010 that the SCRC had formed commercial partnership agreements with Adidas and the World Rugby Shop.

The Southeastern Collegiate Rugby Conference, formed by the aforementioned 11 SEC schools, was created in late 2010 and began play in the 2011–12 season. Florida won the conference title in the inaugural season, defeating Tennessee in the championship match. Although the SEC has since expanded to 14 schools, the SCRC membership remains at 11.

Pacific Athletic Conference

Several members of the Pac-12 conference agreed in spring 2012 to form a conference beginning play in the 2012–13 season.

Other conferences
Nine D1A rugby programs currently compete in the Big Ten Universities conference, which was founded in 2012.
The Red River Conference, which replaced the Allied Rugby Conference in 2014–15, is composed mostly of teams from what had been the Big 12 South from 1996 to 2011. The Southwest Conference (SWC) was created in 2011 with charter members from seven Texas schools. University of Texas was immediately added, and Texas won the conference in the inaugural 2011–12 season.

Other competitions
College rugby includes rivalry trophies such as the World Cup between the University of California, Berkeley and the University of British Columbia (Canada), the Wasatch Cup between BYU and Utah, the University Cup between Texas and Texas A&M, the Koranda Cup between Yale and Princeton, and the Common Wealth Shield between Virginia and Virginia Tech.

The ACRC Bowl Series championship 15s tournament took place annually for three years from 2014 until 2016. College conference champions and select elite sides participated. The tournament provided an opportunity for teams to play outside of their conferences and was therefore relevant to establishing final fall 15s college rankings.

Division II 
Division II is governed by USA Rugby.

Men
1994 – Lock Haven University
1995 – Lock Haven University; runner-up – Salisbury
1996 – Salisbury; runner-up – Coast Guard
1997 – Salisbury; runner-up – Bates
1998 – UC San Diego; runner-up – Oregon
1999 – UC San Diego 21, Chico State 18
2000 – Sacramento State 49, Claremont 3
2001 – Baylor 29, Arkansas State 16
2002 – Stanford 26, Northern Iowa 15
2003 – Radford 32, Northern Colorado 22
2004 – Salisbury 43, Arkansas State 24
2005 – Northern Colorado 24, Humboldt State 22
2006 – Coast Guard 17, Northern Colorado 12
2007 – Middlebury 38, Arkansas State 22
2008 – Radford 25, Utah Valley State 14
2009 – Middlebury 27, Wisconsin 11 
2010 – Claremont Colleges 25, Temple 19 (Claremont promoted to Div. 1)
2011 – UW-Whitewater 7, Middlebury 3
2012 – Lindenwood 50, Salisbury 12 (Lindenwood promoted to Div. 1-AA)
2013 (Spring) – Salisbury 34, Minnesota-Duluth 17
 2013 (Fall) – Minnesota-Duluth 31, Salisbury 7
 2014 – Minnesota-Duluth 24, UW-Whitewater 14
 2015 – Minnesota-Duluth 25, UW-Whitewater 19
 2016 – UW-Whitewater 29, Furman 13
 2017 – UW-Whitewater 34, VMI 27
 2018 – North Carolina State University 57, UW-Whitewater 12
 2019 – Queens University (NC) 74, UW-Whitewater 8
 2020 – cancelled (pandemic)
 2021 – Auburn 31, Montana State 12 (CRAA)
National Collegiate Rugby
Men
 2021 fall – Thomas More 21, Adrian College 17

Women
2000 – Plymouth State, runner-up East Stroudsburg
2001 – Northern Iowa, runner-up Nevada-Reno
2002 – Northern Iowa, runner-up Minnesota
2003 – Dayton, runner-up Northern Iowa
2004 – Temple 17, Providence 7
2005 – Providence 15, Temple 10
2006 – UC Santa Cruz 22, Plymouth State 10
2007 – Iowa State 26, UC Santa Cruz 19
2008 – Shippensburg 47, Minnesota-Duluth 0
2009 – Shippensburg 29, Stonehill 5
2010 – Washington State 37, Temple 0
2011 – Radcliffe 22, University of Notre Dame (South Bend, IN) 10
2012 – Norwich 82, Winona State 12
2013 – Washington State 60, Winona State 5
2014 – Mary Washington 36, Cal State, Northridge 22
2015 – Notre Dame College 69, UC-Riverside 10
2016 – Davenport 61, USC 0
2017 – Davenport 71, Kennesaw State 5
2017–18 (fall) Winona State 38, Vassar 36
(spring) Tulane 31, Claremont Colleges 14
 2018–19 (fall) Vassar 50, Winona State 13
(spring) Fresno State 25, Salisbury 19 
 2019–20 (fall) Winona State 19, Colorado School of Mines 10
(spring) cancelled (pandemic)
 2020–21 (fall) cancelled (pandemic)
(spring) cancelled (pandemic)
 2021–22 (fall) Vassar 74, Temple 5 (ACRA)
(spring) Claremont 22, San Diego State 7 (CRAA)

Division II Sevens
USA Rugby
Men
2013: Principia def. UW–Stout
2014: (moved from fall 2014 to spring 2015)
2015: James Madison 40–22 Wisconsin–Whitewater
2016: Minnesota–Duluth 17–5 Saint Louis
2017: Wisconsin–Whitewater 26–5 UNC Charlotte
2018: UNC Charlotte 38–10 Wisconsin–Whitewater
2019: North Carolina State University 28–12 Wisconsin–Whitewater
2020: cancelled (pandemic)
2021: cancelled (pandemic)
2022: USC 29–7 Memphis
Women
2016: Davenport 24–14 Bloomsburg
2017: eligible for open division
2018: eligible for open division
2019: Bryant 22–19 Fresno State
2020: cancelled (pandemic)
2021: cancelled (pandemic)
2022: San Jose State 22–0 St. Mary's

National Collegiate Rugby
Men
 2022 – Indiana University of Pennsylvania 17–7 Lander

Small Colleges 
Small College Rugby, formerly known as Division III, is governed by the National Collegiate Rugby Organization, formerly the National Small College Rugby Organization (NSCRO). In 2020, NSCRO re-branded as National Collegiate Rugby. The National Small College Rugby Organization was created to give a competitive outlet to small colleges which would not otherwise have an opportunity to compete on a national stage. Each year, the NSCRO hosts rugby tournaments for Men's and Women's college teams, and during 2006–2011 it also conducted a Division IV Women's college tournament.

Men

2002 – Western Carolina University, runner-up Stonehill College
2003 – Furman University, runner-up Stonehill College
2004 – Furman University, runner-up Central Connecticut State
2005 – Furman University, runner-up Duke University
2006 – Bentley University, runner-up The Citadel
2007 – Bentley University 11 – 10 Furman University 
2008 – Plymouth State Univ 22 – 15 Furman University 
2009 – Coastal Carolina 36 – 15 SUNY Oswego 
2010 – Penn State Berks 11 – 6 Keene State
2011 – Longwood University 36 – 27 Occidental College
2012 – Salve Regina 22 – 15 Cal Maritime
2013 – St. John's  (Minn.) def. Duke
2014 – St. John's  (Minn.) def. New England College 
2015 – New England College 32-15 Mt. Saint Mary's (MD)
2016 – Mt. Saint Mary's (MD) 26-19 Claremont Colleges
2017 – Claremont Colleges 65-0 Tufts
2018 – Iowa Central Community College 64-11 Claremont Colleges
2019 – Claremont Colleges 57-17 Christendom College
2020 – cancelled (pandemic)
2021 – Christendom College 34-29 New Mexico Tech

Women
 2002–03 –  College of New Jersey; Runner Up: University of Maine
 2003–04 –  Fordham University; Runner Up: Susquehanna University
 2004–05 –  Castleton State; Runner Up: Susquehanna University
 2005–06 –  Babson University; Runner Up: Ursinus College
 2006–07  (Spring) –  Stonehill College; Runner Up: Penn 
 2007 (Fall) –  Stonehill College; Runner Up: Marist College
 2008 –  Bryant University; Runner-Up: Gettysburg College
 2009 –  MIT; Runner-Up: East Stroudsburg University
 2010 –  Bentley University; Runner-Up: Drexel University
 2011 – Carleton
 2012 – Wayne State (Nebraska)
 2013 – Wayne State  (Nebraska)
 2014 – Roger Williams 45-10 Sacred Heart
 2015 – MSU-Moorhead 44-24 Colgate
 2016 – Wayne State  (Nebraska) 11-0 Colgate
 2017 – Wayne State (Nebraska) 46-26 Bentley 
 2018 – Wayne State (Nebraska) 67-12 Catholic University
 2019 – Wayne State (Nebraska) 90-14 Endicott College
 2020 –  cancelled (pandemic)
 2021 –  Wayne State (Nebraska) 72-10 SUNY–Cortland

Men's 7s

Women's 7s

Division IV
The National Small College Rugby Organization conducted a Women's only Division IV championship from 2006 to 2011.
 2006 – University of Rhode Island; Runner Up: Ursinus College
 2007 – Roger Williams University; Runner Up: Gettysburg College
 2008 – College of the Holy Cross; Runner Up: Albright College
 2009 – Drexel University; Runner-Up: Wentworth Institute of Technology
 2010 – Lock Haven University; Runner-Up: Mount Holyoke College
 2011 – Johnson State College; Runner-up: Albright College

Injuries
In the US, college rugby has much higher injury rates than college football.  Rugby union has similar injury types to American football but with more common injuries of arms.

See also
 MLR Draft
 Major League Rugby
 College athletics
 College football
 College basketball
 College baseball
 College ice hockey
 College soccer
 College lacrosse
 Intercollegiate sports team champions
 Concussions in rugby union
 Rugby union in the United States
 History of rugby union in the United States

References

External links

 College at USA Rugby
 National Collegiate Rugby
 NIRA Rugby

College rugby union in the United States
United States
Rugby